Nässjö FF is a Swedish football club located in Nässjö in Jönköping County.

Background
Nässjö Fotbollförening was founded on 1 January 1985 and is today one of Nässjö Municipality's largest sports clubs with about 900 members. The club is particularly active in terms of youth development with approximately 600 active boys and girls. This means that Nässjö FF are one of Småland's largest youth clubs.

Since their foundation Nässjö FF has participated mainly in the middle divisions of the Swedish football league system.  The club currently plays in Division 2 Nordöstra Götaland which is the fourth tier of Swedish football. They play their home matches at the Skogsvallen in Nässjö.

Nässjö FF are affiliated to Smålands Fotbollförbund.

Recent history
In recent seasons Nässjö FF have competed in the following divisions:

2011 – Division III, Nordöstra Götaland
2010 – Division III, Nordöstra Götaland
2009 – Division II, Mellersta Götaland
2008 – Division III, Nordöstra Götaland
2007 – Division III, Nordöstra Götaland
2006 – Division III, Nordöstra Götaland
2005 – Division III, Nordöstra Götaland
2004 – Division IV, Småland Västra Elit
2003 – Division IV, Småland Östra Elit
2002 – Division III, Nordöstra Götaland
2001 – Division III, Sydöstra Götaland
2000 – Division III, Nordöstra Götaland
1999 – Division III, Nordöstra Götaland
1998 – Division III, Nordöstra Götaland
1997 – Division III, Nordöstra Götaland
1996 – Division III, Mellersta Götaland
1995 – Division II, Östra Götaland
1994 – Division III, Sydvästra Götaland
1993 – Division II, Östra Götaland

Attendances

In recent seasons Nässjö FF have had the following average attendances:

Footnotes

External links
 Nässjö FF – Official Website
  Nässjö FF Facebook

Sport in Nässjö
Football clubs in Jönköping County
Association football clubs established in 1985
1985 establishments in Sweden